HH Azur is a horse ridden by McLain Ward. The duo competed at the Olympic Games in Rio de Janeiro in August 2016 and earned 9th place individually as well as earning a team silver medal. The pair also went on to win the 2017 Longines FEI World Cup Jumping Final and have won many other notable classes.

Life 
HH Azur was foaled in 2006. She is a Belgian Warmblood mare sired by Thunder Van De Zuuthoeve and out of Sion Van De Zuuthoeve; her damsire is Sir Lui. She is owned by Double H Farm in partnership with François Mathy. Along with being a talented jumper, "Annie" also has a friendly personality. According to her grooms, she is friendly and will come say hello upon entering the barn.  She is cared for by a team of grooms including Lee McKeever, Chris Cook, Sean Kissane, Kirsty and Kelly Massari.

Originally named Azur Du Garden, Azur was ridden by Pedro Nolasco up to the international level before being bought by François Mathy and his rider Diego Perez Bilbao took over the ride, who developed her up to 1.45m classes.  Although initially passing up on HH Azur as a five-year-old, Ward's sponsor, Double H Farm, purchased half of her in December 2014, giving Ward the ride.  In their first year together, Ward and Annie won many major classes all over North America.  The following year, the pair competed in their first championship together at the 2016 Olympic Games in   Rio de Janeiro placing 9th individually and team silver.  HH Azur jumped completely cleanly at the 2017 World Cup Jumping Finals in Omaha, Nebraska to take the championship for the first time in Ward's career. HH Azur jumped only clear rounds in team competition in 2017. She also jumped at the 2018 World Cup Finals in Paris where she finished 4th overall.  HH Azur struggled with some injuries in 2019, but won the Lugano Diamonds Grand Prix in Wellington, Florida in February 2020, shortly before the horse show circuit was paused due to the COVID-19 pandemic. 

HH Azur is shown in a twisted snaffle bit. Although quiet on the flat, HH Azur can light up to the jumps. She has enough energy that can carry her through a championship format such as the Olympics. She tends to be calm and not phased and is easy to work with in the barn.

Major Results

References 

Warmbloods
Show jumping horses